Warlords is a 1988 American film directed by Fred Olen Ray starring David Carradine.

References

External links
Warlords at IMDb
Warlords at Letterbox DVD

1988 films
Films directed by Fred Olen Ray